The Gaohu (高胡) is a Chinese bowed string instrument developed from the erhu. 

Gaohu (高湖镇) may also refer to the following towns in China:

 Gaohu, Hunan, in Hengdong County, Hunan
 Gaohu, Jiangxi, in Jing'an County, Jiangxi
 Gaohu, Zhejiang, in Qingtian County, Zhejiang